Alex Do, better known by his online alias HD or HDStarcraft, is a former e-sports commentator for StarCraft II, a video game published by Blizzard Entertainment. He appears as a commentator at StarCraft tournaments worldwide, and his commentary is viewable through YouTube channels.

Career
During the beta of StarCraft II, HD collaborated with fellow commentator Husky to host the "HDH Invitational", a StarCraft II tournament consisting of sixteen of the top professional StarCraft II gamers from around the world. The tournament was played in an entirely virtual environment over the Battle.net server, and the games were later broadcast on YouTube. The tournament was sponsored, and cash prizes were awarded. Neither HD nor Husky actually have a background in casting sports commentary, despite the pair's popularity.

HD has been both a commentator and a player in Major League Gaming's tournaments in 2010. HD provided commentary for StarCraft II alongside Sean "Day9" Plott, JP McDaniel, and Husky for the Pro Circuit at Raleigh in August 2010. Later in the year, HD was a StarCraft II player at the national championships at Dallas in November 2010.

HD and StarCraft II professional gamer Taylor "PainUser" Parsons presented a Google Tech Talk in September 2010. The talk itself covered StarCraft II and electronic sports, while including a commentary by HD and Parsons on the StarCraft II tournament finals played amongst Google employees.

References

StarCraft commentators
American Internet celebrities
Living people
Year of birth missing (living people)